The 2002–03 Ohio Bobcats men's basketball team represented Ohio University in the college basketball season of 2002–03. The team was coached by Tim O'Shea and played their home games at the Convocation Center. They finished the season 14–16 and 8–10 in MAC play to finish fifth in the MAC East.

Roster

Team players drafted into the NBA

Preseason
The preseason poll was announced by the league office on October 24, 2002.  Ohio was picked first in the MAC East

Preseason men's basketball poll
(First place votes in parenthesis)

East Division
 Ohio (22) 199
  (5) 166
  (7) 155
  (1) 94
  (1) 89
  58

West Division
  (33) 249
  191
  (3) 155
  126
  117
 Central Michigan 113
 Eastern Michigan 50

Preseason All-MAC 

Source

Schedule and results
Source: 

|-
!colspan=9 style=| Regular Season

|-
!colspan=9 style=| MAC Tournament

|-

Statistics

Team Statistics
Final 2002–03 Statistics

Source

Player statistics

Source

Awards and honors

All-MAC Awards 

Source

References

Ohio Bobcats men's basketball seasons
Ohio
Ohio Bobcats men's basketball
Ohio Bobcats men's basketball